Copestylum caudatum, the hairy-horned bromeliad fly, is a species of syrphid fly in the family Syrphidae.

Distribution
Central Western North America.

References

Eristalinae
Diptera of North America
Hoverflies of North America
Articles created by Qbugbot
Insects described in 1927
Taxa named by Charles Howard Curran